Mecistogaster amalia is a species of damselfly in the family Pseudostigmatidae known commonly as the Amalia helicopter. It is endemic to Brazil, where it lives in Atlantic rainforest.

References

Pseudostigmatidae
Endemic fauna of Brazil
Insects described in 1839
Taxonomy articles created by Polbot